Vello Saatpalu (31 May 1935 Tallinn – 5 January 2013) was an Estonian engineer, politician and sport sailor. He was a member of VII Riigikogu.

References

1935 births
2013 deaths
Estonian engineers
Estonian male sailors (sport)
Social Democratic Party (Estonia) politicians
Members of the Riigikogu, 1992–1995
Tallinn University of Technology alumni
People from Tallinn
Politicians from Tallinn
Burials at Rahumäe Cemetery